The 2016 Supercopa Euroamericana was the second and final edition of the Supercopa Euroamericana, a men's football friendly tournament created by DirecTV, disputed between the Copa Sudamericana and the UEFA Europa League winners. The match was played in 2016 by Santa Fe, the 2015 Copa Sudamericana champions, and Sevilla, the 2014–15 UEFA Europa League champions. The match took place on 24 July at the ESPN Wide World of Sports Complex in Bay Lake, Florida. Sevilla won the match 2–1.

Format
The match was played for 90 minutes. In case of a draw after regulation, the winners were determined via a penalty shoot-out.

Details

See also
Sevilla FC in international football competitions

References

External links 
Supercopa Euroamericana: Official site

Supercopa Euroamericana
Supercopa Euroamericana
Supercopa Euroamericana
Supercopa Euroamericana 2016
Supercopa Euroamericana 2016
Supercopa Euroamericana
Supercopa Euroamericana
Soccer in Florida
July 2016 sports events in the United States